What About Now is the twelfth studio album by American rock band Bon Jovi. Produced by John Shanks, the album was released on March 8, 2013 in Australia and March 12, 2013 in the United States. The album was promoted throughout the band's 2013 Because We Can: The Tour. It is the last album to feature lead guitarist Richie Sambora before his departure from the band the following month.

The album debuted at No. 1 in the U.S., where it sold 101,000 copies in its first week. What About Now became Bon Jovi's third album in a row to hit No. 1 in US after The Circle and Lost Highway and their fifth No. 1 album during their career. The album has sold 220,000 copies in the U.S. as of August 2015, and over 1.5 million copies worldwide, going gold in Germany selling 100,000 copies.

Recording and production
In an interview given to Classic Rock magazine, guitarist Richie Sambora stated that the album was recorded before his solo album Aftermath of the Lowdown was completed. He and Jon started to write and before they knew it, they were in the studio with the band. "The record is now finished and sounding great, and we start our 2013 tour in February, so we'll be at a stadium near you very soon."

Richie Sambora also characterized the new material as a compilation of “different elements”; yet reassured old fans that they will be just as pleased with the new work as they have been with the old for over 30 years.

Music videos were produced for the first two singles "Because We Can" and the album titled track "What About Now". A music video was also made for the Jon Bon Jovi solo single "Not Running Anymore" which is included on the album as a bonus track along with the track "Old Habits Die Hard". Both songs feature on the soundtrack to the movie Stand Up Guys. On December 13, 2012 it was announced that "Not Running Anymore" would be nominated for a Golden Globe Award.

Also included as a bonus track and featuring a music video is Sambora's single "Every Road Leads Home to You" from his solo album Aftermath of the Lowdown.

Artwork
The album artwork was created by Liu Bolin and was revealed on January 10, 2013, three days after the release of lead single "Because We Can". The cover artwork features the four members of the band painted behind a collage which features a soldier with a guitar and walking up a mountain against a yellow and blue American flag background, two hands wrapped in bandages, a headshot of a woman, some roses, and the band's heart and dagger symbol. A pinwheel is also seen in the background. The cover artwork is also seen on the back, though the collage has more pictures to it and the band members are absent.

Reception

Critical reception of the album has been generally mixed. At Metacritic, which assigns a normalized rating out of 100 to reviews from critics, the album received an average score of 50, which indicates "mixed or average reviews", based on 11 reviews. While Caroline Sullivan from The Guardian states that "the band have reached out with the sort of empowering platitudes and riffage that will give fans on this summer's stadium tour something to punch the air about", Stephen Unwin from the Daily Express was less favorable, claiming that the album "is the closest thing to predictable from the poster boys of American rock ’n’ roll, which for their most myopic fans is the closest thing to wonderful."

Phil Mongrendien, from the Toronto Star, criticized the track "Army of One" for finding them "descending into lyrical self-parody with its 'never give up' motif hammered home artlessly"
 while the title track's guitar "hook nods too much to Kraftwerk's 'Computer Love' (and, by extension, Coldplay's 'Talk')". James Manning, from Time Out, believes that the band "won't win any new fans with their twelfth album [...] but they're unlikely to lose many either."

Ian Gittins, from Virgin Media, thought "the band's perennial propensity for clichés and Hollywood blockbuster-style happy endings invariably make it difficult to take Bon Jovi as seriously as they crave", though he later admits that "there are some good tunes. It's a decent soft rock party album. It's probably also about time that Bon Jovi knew their limits." For Stephen Erlewine, from Allmusic, "there aren't so many big hooks on What About Now -- just the raise-your-fist anthem of 'Because We Can,' with most of the sweetest melodies coming from the softer, quieter moments, such as the acoustic 'The Fighter' and the Christian ballad 'Room at the End of the World'.

Track listing
All tracks produced by John Shanks. Co-produced by Jon Bon Jovi and Richie Sambora.

Personnel
Bon Jovi
 Jon Bon Jovi – lead vocals
 Richie Sambora – guitars, backing vocals
 David Bryan – keyboards, backing vocals
 Tico Torres – drums

Additional personnel
 Hugh McDonald – bass
 David Campbell – string arranger & conductor

Charts

Weekly charts

Year-end charts

Certifications

Release history

References

Bon Jovi albums
2013 albums
Albums produced by Richie Sambora
Albums produced by John Shanks
Island Records albums